Shayne Elliott (born 1963/64) is a New Zealand banker, and the chief executive officer (CEO) of ANZ Bank.

Career 
Prior to joining ANZ Bank, Shayne Elliott was a senior executive at EFG Hermes, and worked for Citi bank. He joined ANZ Bank in June 2009 as the head of the bank's institutional division. In 2012, Elliott became CFO of ANZ. In September 2015, it was announced that Elliott would be replacing Mike Smith as ANZ's CEO starting January 1, 2016.

As CEO of ANZ, Elliott was praised for his 'purpose' driven leadership, which has seen the bank support the LGBTQI community and refugees in Australia.

Personal life 
Shayne Elliott is the son of a builder, and grew up in Te Atatū South, a suburb of Auckland. He was educated at Waitakere College and the University of Auckland.

Elliott is married to Najla, an Egyptian-born economist, who he met when he was running Citigroup's Egypt business in Cairo.

References

Living people
1960s births
Businesspeople from Auckland
University of Auckland alumni
New Zealand bankers
New Zealand chief executives
Australia and New Zealand Banking Group